"Bonny Light Horseman" (Roud 1185), also known as "Broken Hearted I Will Wander", is a folk song. The singer's romantic interest was killed while fighting against Napoleon in the Peninsular War.  It has been recorded by musicians including Nic Jones, Planxty, Lal and Norma Waterson, Rebecca Fox, Todd Menton, Oisin, Eliza Carthy and Nancy Kerr.

References

Peninsular War
Napoleonic Wars in popular culture
English folk songs